The Saleen S7 is an American hand-built, high-performance sports car designed and built by American automobile manufacturer Saleen Automotive Inc. Developed jointly by Steve Saleen for the initial concept, direction and engine, Hidden Creek Industries for resources and initial funding, Ray Mallock Ltd. (RML) for chassis, suspension and aerodynamics, and Phil Frank for the body and interior CAD design and development.

It was the first fully proprietary car produced by Saleen and became America's sixth mid-engine production sports car coming after the Pontiac Fiero, Consulier GTP, Mosler Raptor, Vector W8, and M12. The S7 debuted on August 19, 2000, at the Monterey Historic Races. The all-aluminium engine is a proprietary unit developed and built in house, it is a bored-and-stroked derivative of Ford's 351 Windsor small block architecture with Cleveland-style canted valve heads which have been extensively reworked and modified. 
Having a large displacement of  the engine is based on and has been developed around the more compact and lighter small-block architecture and is in fact not based on the FE big-block. It proved remarkably tractable and flexible for a high-output requirement— at 6,400 rpm.

Overview

Exterior 

The body of the car, made entirely from carbon fiber, incorporates the use of scoops, spoilers, and other aerodynamic features to create Split Channel airflow throughout the car. At , the car creates its own weight in downforce.

Interior 
Leather appears throughout the cabin, with aluminum accents. The S7 comes with a set of custom-fit luggage. Because of the car's mid-engine layout, it has two trunks at the front and rear. Other features include an LCD monitor, rear-view camera, quick-release steering wheel and a  speedometer. The cabin is of an asymmetrical layout, and comes with fixed seats, with the driver's seat positioned toward the center to improve both the driver's visibility and center the driver's weight in the vehicle.

Chassis 
The chassis uses a space frame-derived design consisting of 4130 lightweight steel and aluminium honeycomb composite reinforcing panels. It is divided into bolt-fastened sub-assemblies to allow for rapid access to critical subsystems.

Performance 
It completes a standing  in an estimated 11.35 seconds, reaching . Top speed is an estimated .

Electrical systems 
Standard electronics include: Power windows, power door locks, remote control operated doors, hood, trunk, and engine compartment openers, electronic power steering with redundant safety circuits, 110 volt inlet for maintaining the battery, electronic heated front window, shut off control for electronic fuel pump upon crash impact and a rearview camera system with in-dash flip-up monitor and navigation. The electrical wire harnesses were said to be manufactured with the "highest quality materials." Teflon-coated tinned military specification wire, cannon plugs, gold plated pins and sockets were used for the connectors, and wire harnesses were wrapped with a high-temperature glass mesh under a woven Kevlar outer skin.

S7 Twin Turbo

Engine
The front and rear diffusers and the rear spoiler were also reworked to increase downforce by 60%.

Performance (Mfg Estimates) 
 0–: 2.7 sec
 0–: 5.9 sec
 0–: 27 sec
 : 10.5 sec
 Top speed:

Competition package 
In 2006, Saleen offered an optional competition package for the S7 Twin Turbo.

S7 LM
In 2017, Saleen announced the relaunch of the S7 sports car. The new car, called the S7 LM commemorated Saleen's success in motorsports. Additional wind tunnel development lead to modifications in the exterior design which includes a full width rear spoiler, side skirts and under body channels along with new forged alloy wheels. The interior comes with bucket seats, a digital tachometer, shift light indicator and a 240 mph speedometer. In 2019, it was reported that the power output and performance of the car were updated. It wasn't clear that how many cars would be made.

S7-R 

The Saleen S7-R is a racing version of the standard, naturally aspirated S7, produced from 2000 to 2007. It was designed to compete in grand tourer–style motorsports series and events such as the American Le Mans Series, FIA GT Championship, and 24 Hours of Le Mans. The 7.0 L (427 cu. in.) naturally-aspirated V8 engine produces about 631 hp, and 610 lb-ft of torque, using two air intake restrictor plates. Unrestricted, however, the engine is capable of producing a massive 760 hp, and 740 lb-ft of torque. Ray Mallock Ltd. (RML) assembled the first few S7-Rs under the supervision of Saleen's engineering team in their workshops in Britain, before Saleen assumed control over all S7-R assembly with the French Oreca squad executing final outfitting in 2006. A total of fourteen S7-Rs were completed to race-ready condition. Seven additional S7-Rs were assembled to a level of completeness requiring the assignment of Vehicle Identification Numbers; however, these chassis were never outfitted into complete vehicles.

In 2004, Ferrari had gathered VIPs and automotive press around the world at Ferrari's Autodromo Enzo e Dino Ferrari race track for the round 8 of the FIA GT Super Racing Weekend Imola to witness the sure victory of their race cars and then new Maserati MC12 GT1 against foreign competition. Vitaphone Racing's S7-R driven by Michael Bartels and Uwe Alzen competed against two Maserati MC12s, three Ferrari 550s, three Ferrari 575s and two Lamborghini Murcielagos in GT Class specification securing the overall win. Ferrari's then CEO Luca Cordero di Montezemolo was in attendance of the race and he admitted the S7-R's victory by saying "We were no match for the Saleen today". It was regarded as one of the biggest upsets in auto racing history by the automotive press as a race car from a low volume manufacturer had beaten Ferrari at their home track.

Racing history 

The Saleen S7 has been very successful in international motorsports having amassed many victories in professional racing in a number of different classes competing across the globe in America, Asia and Europe. The first S7-R assembled by RML was completed in late 2000 and made its racing debut in the American Le Mans Series event at Laguna Seca Raceway. Run by Saleen-Allen Speedlab, the car finishes in 26th place. For 2001, the first customer chassis would be completed, and their respective teams would enter various championships: Fordahl Motorsports ran in the Grand American Road Racing Championship, RML ran the European Le Mans Series, and Konrad Motorsport ran both ALMS and ELMS. This car with chassis number 001 was named Christine by Saleen engineers.

The S7-R quickly showed its capabilities, when Konrad finished in sixth place at the 12 Hours of Sebring, earning their first class victory. Fordahl won seven Grand American events en route to finishing second in the class championship, while RML won four ELMS events and won that championship by a mere point over the Konrad Saleens. Saleen-Allen Speedlab also earned a podium finish at the 24 Hours of Le Mans with an 18th-place finish overall.

For 2002, Konrad Motorsport concentrated mostly on the American Le Mans Series (the ELMS having been dissolved following 2001), while Park Place Racing took over Fordahl's entry in Grand American. Newcomer Graham Nash Motorsport won both the British GT and Spanish GT Championships. Park Place won four races and earned their first championship title, while Graham Nash won nine British GT and four Spanish GT races, earning them the title in both series. Konrad Motorsport however struggled against the faster, higher-budget Corvette Racing team and could not score any victories, but were able to finish second in the championship.

Konrad Motorsport chose to move their Saleen squad to Europe in order to compete in the FIA GT Championship in 2003, leaving North America without a full-season competitor for the S7-R as Park Place abandoned the Grand American championship. Graham Nash joined Konrad in FIA GT, earning a sixth-place finish in the championship. For 2004, Saleen would have a resurgence of teams as RML returned to run FIA GT, Dominique Dupuy's DDO team entered the FFSA GT Championship, Konrad assisted the new Vitaphone Racing, and ACEMCO Motorsports purchased two brand-new S7-Rs, modified to better compete in the American Le Mans Series. Vitaphone earned three victories in FIA GT en route to a fourth place in the championship, while DDO earned two victories in FFSA GT.

Fortunes would quickly turn for the S7-Rs in the 2005 season. Konrad and Graham Nash saw their racing efforts downsized as the teams hit economic problems. Vitaphone Racing moved on from the S7-R and raced a Maserati MC12 to the FIA GT championship. This left ACEMCO to take second in the American Le Mans Series, while DDO earned the only Saleen wins that year with three.

In an attempt to rebound from 2005, Saleen chose to concentrate on select series and events. ACEMCO dropped out from the American Le Mans Series in order to concentrate solely on entering the 2006 24 Hours of Le Mans where they earned an 11th-place finish, the best ever by a Saleen at the time. Oreca was chosen to prepare new S7-R chassis with upgrades under the supervision of Saleen engineers William Tally, Derk Hartland, Randall Speir, Matthew W. Wright and William Kreig to make them more competitive, which led to the team earning two victories in the Le Mans Series and winning the 2006 FFSA GT Championship. In FIA GT, Zakspeed took over as the factory squad with Balfe Racing running as a privateer. Zakspeed managed to earn two victories and earn themselves fourth in the championship.

For 2007, Zakspeed was forced to abandon their FIA GT effort as the team went bankrupt during the off-season. ACEMCO also was forced to withdraw and offer their S7-Rs for sale. Oreca finish-assembled two more chassis using subassemblies provided by Saleen, with one going to the Italian Racing Box squad who would compete alongside Oreca in the Le Mans Series. Oreca won four races during the season.

In 2010, the Oreca finish-assembled S7-R (chassis number 610) of Larbre Compétition won the final and its only LMGT1 class victory at the 24 Hours of Le Mans.  Initial fabrication and assembly of this chassis was performed by Saleen's Irvine, CA engineering team in 2006-2007 after normal business hours due to a shortage of funding.  Subsequently, Saleen engineers named the car Melissa, after the girlfriend of one of the Saleen race engineers.

References

Citations

External links 

 Saleen - Official S7 Twin Turbo website
 Ray Mallock Ltd. (RML) - Developer of the S7
 Phil Frank Design, LLC - Designer of the S7
 World Sports Racing Prototypes - Saleen S7-R chassis history

2000s cars
Rear mid-engine, rear-wheel-drive vehicles
S7
Sports cars